Provincial Road 366 (PR 366) is a provincial road in the Canadian province of Manitoba.

Route description 
Provincial Road 366 starts in the Swan River Valley region of Manitoba, serving Bowsman and Minitonas, crosses the Duck Mountains, and then goes through west-central Manitoba from Grandview to Inglis.

PR 366 serves as the main north-south route through Duck Mountain Provincial Park. It is mainly a gravel route, but there are short paved sections in Bowsman and Inglis, and longer paved stretches leading up to the Duck Mountains from both Minitonas and Grandview.

History 
Since it was established, several changes and improvements have been made to the travel route:
 The road was moved west of its original alignment past Wellman Lake. Most of the original route, now called Regatta Bay Road, remains in use for access to a cabin subdivision and two Bible camps.
 During the summer of 2012, intersection improvements were made to PR 366's two junctions along PTH 10, including an exit ramp from PTH 10 to southbound PR 366 near Minitonas.
 The northernmost section of PR 366 (past PTH 10) has changed several times. Originally, it went straight north to PR 268, crossing PR 587 directly east of Bowsman. Then, for a time, the route was turned over to the local municipalities, and the official terminus of PR 366 was at PTH 10 near Minitonas. However, in 2006 a ford crossing on PR 587 was decommissioned, rendering the eastern portion of that route useless, except to local traffic. Rather than having PR 587 make a dead-end at Craigsford, the western part of PR 587 was resigned as PR 366, and another portion of the original PR 366 was re-established from PTH 10 to Craigsford. Thus, the route now connects Minitonas and Bowsman via Craigsford.

References

366